The 1957 Furman Purple Hurricane football team was an American football team that represented Furman University as a member of the Southern Conference (SoCon) during the 1957 NCAA University Division football season. Led by third-year head coach Homer Hobbs, the Purple Hurricane compiled an overall record of 3–7 with a mark of 2–1 in conference play, placing fourth in the SoCon.

Schedule

References

Furman
Furman Paladins football seasons
Furman Purple Hurricane football